The fifth season of Mad TV, an American sketch comedy series, originally aired in the United States on the Fox Network between September 25, 1999, and May 20, 2000.

Summary 
Season 5 of Mad TV began with only a few changes to the cast: Nelson Ascencio (the show's first Cuban-American cast member and first cast member to have an identical twin brother who sometimes appeared in sketches with him) and Brooke Totman joined the show as featured players. This was the last season for Pat Kilbane and original cast member Phil LaMarr, and would be the only season for Brooke Totman. This would be the final season for the Spy vs. Spy shorts.

The previous year's newcomers, Michael McDonald and Mo Collins, reprised their wacky mother/son duo Stuart and Doreen Larkin; separately, Collins played Lorraine Swanson and McDonald played Marvin Tikvah and Rusty Miller. Alex Borstein's Ms. Swan starred in the multi-part sketch "Swan: The Homecoming," which featured special celebrity appearances in each episode by Garry Marshall, Mark Hamill, Dennis Hopper, Susan Sarandon, and Tony Shalhoub. After a noticeable weight loss, Will Sasso began to impersonate more celebrities such as James Gandolfini. Nicole Sullivan would be the first cast member to portray pop star Britney Spears. Aries Spears and Debra Wilson introduced a sketch called Reality Check, a fictitious talk show on BET. This May 13, 2000 episode is referenced in Indigo White's Kimber's Home YouTube video when he describes a transgender journey that was parodied in the fictitious "Kimber's Home Alone" sketch.

Former Mad TV alumnus Artie Lange made a special appearance, as well as celebrities Carmen Electra, Catherine O'Hara, George Carlin, Regis Philbin, Tim Robbins, and Alex Borstein's Family Guy co-star Seth Green (as recurring character Mr. Brightling).

Opening montage 
The Mad TV logo appears and the theme song, which is performed by the hip-hop group Heavy D & the Boyz, begins. Cast members are introduced alphabetically. When the last cast member is introduced, the music stops and the title sequence ends with the phrase "You are now watching Mad TV."

Cast

Repertory cast members
 Alex Borstein  (25/25 episodes) 
 Mo Collins  (25/25 episodes) 
 Pat Kilbane  (25/25 episodes) 
 Phil LaMarr  (17/25 episodes) 
 Michael McDonald  (25/25 episodes) 
 Will Sasso  (25/25 episodes) 
 Aries Spears  (25/25 episodes) 
 Nicole Sullivan  (20/25 episodes) 
 Debra Wilson  (25/25 episodes) 

Featured cast members
 Nelson Ascencio  (4/25 episodes, first episode: November 27, 1999) 
 Brooke Totman  (4/25 episodes, first episode: January 15, 2000)

Writers

Bryan Adams (eps. 1-25)
Russell Arch (ep. 4)
Dick Blasucci (eps. 1-25)
Alex Borstein (eps. 11, 21, 25)
Garry Campbell (writing supervisor) (eps. 1-25)
Blaine Capatch (eps. 3, 8, 12) (eps. 3, 8: Encore) 
Greg Cohen (eps. 1-11)
Xavier Cook (eps. 15-25)
Lauren Dombrowski (eps. 1-25)
Dave Hanson (ep. 14) (Season 01 Encore)
Brian Hartt (eps. 1-25)
Michael Hitchcock (eps. 1-25)
Scott King (eps. 1-25)
Michael Koman (eps. 1-25)
Phil LaMarr (ep. 9)
Lanier Laney (eps. 1-25)
Bruce McCoy (eps. 2-25)
Michael McDonald (eps. 1, 3-5, 7-11, 13, 16-18, 22, 23, 25)
Devon Shepard (eps. 1-25)
Michael Short (ep. 5) (Season 04 Encore)
Bob Smith (eps. 14-25)
Emily Spivey (eps. 1-25)
Michael Stoyanov (eps. 1-5, 13)
Nicole Sullivan (eps. 12, 18)
Terry Sweeney (eps. 1-25)

Episodes

Home Release
This season is included on the HBO Max streaming service, with episodes 2, 7, 11, 12, 13, 15, 16, 17, 18, 19, 20, 22, and 24 missing.

External links 
 Mad TV - Official Website
 

05
1999 American television seasons
2000 American television seasons